Nos Vemos En El Camino (English: See You On The Way), is the title for El Sueño De Morfeo's second official studio album was released in Spain April 17, 2007.

The First Single "Para Toda La Vida" was premiered March 10, 2007 in "Del 40 al 1" from radio program Los40 Principales Spain.
On March 24 the first single debuted at #34 in Los40 Chart.

Track listing
 Nos Vemos En El Camino
 Nada Es Suficiente
 Un Túnel Entre Tu y Yo (Los Serrano Theme Song) 
 Para Toda La Vida [3:58]
 Chocar  
 Demasiado Tarde
 En Un Rincón (vocals David Feito)
 Ciudades perdidas 
 Entérate Ya  
 No Me Dejes 
 Dentro De Ti 
 Mi Columna De Opinión 
 Capítulo II
 Sonrisa Especial (Bonus Track)

Charts

References

2007 albums
El Sueño de Morfeo albums